This is a list of the 250 members of the 11th convocation of the National Assembly of Serbia, as well as a list of former members of this convocation.

The 11th convocation of the National Assembly was elected in the 2016 parliamentary election, and it first met on 3 June 2016.

Total membership by political party or movement at the dissolution of the assembly

List of members of the 11th National Assembly at its dissolution

List of members of the 11th National Assembly who left prior to its dissolution

References